Goraj  (German language: Eibendorf) is a village in the administrative district of Gmina Przytoczna, within Międzyrzecz County, Lubusz Voivodeship, in western Poland.

The village has a population of 530.

References

Goraj